George Coe (1929–2015) was an American stage, film and television actor and voice artist.

George Coe may also refer to:

 George Coe (Lincoln County War) (1856–1941), Old West cowboy
 George Coe (Michigan politician) (1811–1869), politician from the U. S. state of Michigan
 George Coe (mayor), American mayor of Lancaster, Pennsylvania, 1962–1966

See also
 George H. Coes (1828–1897), minstrel musician